Bosch process may refer to:

Bosch deep reactive-ion etching, a microfabrication technique to form high aspect ratio features.
Haber–Bosch process, ammonia production method in chemical industry.